Aspergilloglutamic peptidase, also called aspergillopepsin II (proctase A,  Aspergillus niger acid proteinase A, Aspergillus niger var. macrosporus aspartic proteinase) is a proteolytic enzyme.  The enzyme was previously thought be an aspartic protease, but it was later shown to be a glutamic protease with a catalytic Glu residue at the active site, and was therefore renamed aspergilloglutamic peptidase.

Determination of its molecular structure showed it to be a unique two-chain enzyme with a light chain and a heavy chain bound non-covalently with each other.  The C-terminal region of the light chain of one molecule binds to the active site cleft of another molecule in the manner of a substrate.

This enzyme catalyses the following chemical reaction

 Preferential cleavage in B chain of insulin: Asn3-Gln, Gly13-Ala, Tyr26-Thr

This enzyme is isolated from Aspergillus niger var. macrosporus.

References

External links 
 

EC 3.4.23